Marinduque's at-large congressional district, also known as Marinduque's lone district, is the sole congressional district of the Philippines in the province of Marinduque. Marinduque has been represented in the country's various national legislatures since 1898. The first congressional delegation consisted of two members in the First Philippine Republic legislature known as the Malolos Congress. Since 1922 when it was re-established as a regular province separate from Tayabas, Marinduque has been entitled to one member in the House of Representatives of the Philippines, elected provincewide at-large, except for a brief period between 1943 and 1944 when it was again eliminated and included as part of Tayabas's at-large representation for the National Assembly of the Second Philippine Republic.

The district is currently represented by Lord Allan Jay Velasco of the Nationalist People's Coalition.

Representation history

Election results

2022

2019

2016

2013

2010

See also
Legislative districts of Marinduque

References

Congressional districts of the Philippines
Politics of Marinduque
1898 establishments in the Philippines
1920 establishments in the Philippines
At-large congressional districts of the Philippines
Congressional districts of Mimaropa
Constituencies established in 1898
Constituencies disestablished in 1901
Constituencies established in 1920
Constituencies disestablished in 1972
Constituencies established in 1984